Supply and Depend is the first full-length release by  Warship, the band founded by  Fran Mark and Rob Lauritsen, formerly of the now defunct From Autumn to Ashes. It was released on November 4, 2008 on Vagrant Records and features 10 tracks the band recorded with producer Andrew Schneider over the summer. Almost all of the songs from the album were played live on the band's recent tour with Reggie and the Full Effect.

Artist Brad Bacon made the cover of the album. Shirts with the album cover on them are also available at the band's shows.

Track listing 
 "Toil" – 4:34
 "Profit Over People" – 3:33 
 "Wounded Paw" – 3:38
 "Where's Your Leash" – 3:49
 "Lousy Horoscope" – 4:33 
 "We've Never Been Equal" – 2:48 
 "Fetus Flytrap" – 4:13
 "Empty Vessel" – 2:52
 "The Waiting List" – 4:52
 "Indoors" – 3:57

Personnel 
 Francis Mark – drums & vocals
 Rob Lauritsen – guitar & bass

References 

2008 albums
Warship (band) albums